Claudin-2 is a protein that in humans is encoded by the CLDN2 gene. It belongs to the group of claudins.

Members of the claudin protein family, such as CLDN2, are expressed in an organ-specific manner and regulate the tissue-specific physiologic properties of tight junctions (Sakaguchi et al., 2002).[supplied by OMIM]

Function 
Claudin-2 is expressed in cation-leaky epithelia such as that of the kidney proximal tubule. Mice that are deficient in claudin-2 have reduced reabsorption of Na+ in the proximal tubule, consistent with a role in paracellular transport.
Similar results have been obtained with cultured cells, as overexpression in claudin-2 lacking cells leads to increase of permeability for small cations.
Furthermore, claudin-2 has been shown to form paracellular channels for water.

References

External links

Further reading